Roquefort is a sheep milk cheese from Southern France, and is one of the world's best known blue cheeses. Though similar cheeses are produced elsewhere, EU law dictates that only those cheeses aged in the natural Combalou caves of Roquefort-sur-Soulzon may bear the name Roquefort, as it is a recognised geographical indication, or has a protected designation of origin.

The cheese is white, tangy, creamy and slightly moist, with distinctive veins of blue mold. It has a characteristic fragrance and flavor with a notable taste of butyric acid; the blue veins provide a sharp tang. It has no rind; the exterior is edible and slightly salty. Each kilogram of finished cheese requires about 4.5 liters of milk to produce. In France, Roquefort is often called the "King of Cheeses" or the "Cheese of Kings", although those names are also used for other cheeses.

History
According to legend, Roquefort cheese was discovered when a youth, eating his lunch of bread and ewes' milk cheese, saw a beautiful girl in the distance. Abandoning his meal in a nearby cave, he ran to meet her. When he returned a few months later, the mold (Penicillium roqueforti) had transformed his plain cheese into Roquefort.

In 79 AD, Pliny the Elder praised the cheeses of Lozère and Gévaudan and reported their popularity in ancient Rome; in 1737, Jean Astruc suggested that this was a reference to an ancestor of Roquefort. The theory was widely taken up, and by the 1860s was being promoted by the Société des Caves. Others have dismissed the idea, on the grounds that Pliny does not clearly identify a blue cheese. There is no clear consensus on the meaning of Pliny's description—it has been variously interpreted as a reference to fromage frais, cheese pickled in grape-juice, and even fondue, as well as a reference to Roquefort.

By the middle ages, Roquefort had become a recognized cheese. On 4 June 1411, Charles VI granted a monopoly for the ripening of the cheese to the people of Roquefort-sur-Soulzon as they had been doing for centuries.

By 1820, Roquefort was producing 300 tonnes a year, a figure that steadily increased throughout the next century so that by 1914 it was 9,250.

In 1925, the cheese was the recipient of France's first Appellation d'Origine Contrôlée when regulations controlling its production and naming were first defined. In 1961, in a landmark ruling that removed imitation, the Tribunal de Grande Instance at Millau decreed that, although the method for the manufacture of the cheese could be followed across the south of France, only those cheeses whose ripening occurred in the natural caves of Mont Combalou in Roquefort-sur-Soulzon were permitted to bear the name Roquefort.

Production

The mold that gives Roquefort its distinctive character (Penicillium roqueforti) is found in the soil of the local caves. Traditionally, the cheesemakers extracted it by leaving bread in the caves for six to eight weeks until it was consumed by the mold. The interior of the bread was then dried to produce a powder. In modern times, the mold can be grown in a laboratory, which allows for greater consistency. The mold may either be added to the curd or introduced as an aerosol through holes poked in the rind.

Roquefort is made entirely from the milk of the Lacaune breed of sheep. Prior to the AOC regulations of 1925, a small amount of cow's or goat's milk was sometimes added. Around  of milk is required to make one kilogram of Roquefort.

The cheese is produced throughout the département of Aveyron and part of the nearby départements of Aude, Lozère, Gard, Hérault and Tarn.

, there are seven Roquefort producers. The largest-volume brand by far is  made by the Société des Caves de Roquefort (a subsidiary of Lactalis), which holds several caves and opens its facilities to tourists, and accounts for around 60% of all production. Roquefort Papillon is also a well-known brand. The five other producers, each holding only one cave, are Carles, Vernières and Le Vieux Berger.

Around three million cheeses were made in 2005 (18,830 tons) making it, after Comté, France's second-most-popular cheese.

Production of Roquefort cheese entails "4,500 people who herd special ewes on 2,100 farms producing milk ... in a carefully defined oval grazing area across the Larzac Plain and up and down nearby hills and valleys." Total production in 2008 of about 19,000 tons was reported. The proportion of Roquefort exported to the United States remained small, only 450 tons out of 3,700 in total exports. Spain, with purchases of 1,000 tons, was by far the largest foreign customer. In early 2009, Susan Schwab, the then-outgoing US Trade Representative, announced a 300% tariff on the cheese, apparently the highest level by far of any in the package of tariffs placed on dozens of European luxury goods in response to a European ban on hormone-treated US beef. The tariff was suspended several months later as the US and EU settled the dispute.

Consumption and other uses
The regional cuisine in and around Aveyron includes many Roquefort-based recipes for main-course meat sauces, savory tarts and quiches, pies, and fillings.

Contrary to popular belief, Penicillium roqueforti does not produce penicillin. However, due to the presence of other anti-inflammatory proteins, it was common in country districts for shepherds to apply this cheese to wounds to avoid gangrene.

AOC regulations
The  regulations that govern the production of Roquefort have been laid down over a number of decrees by the INAO. These include:
All milk used must be delivered at least 20 days after lambing has taken place.
The sheep must be on pasture, whenever possible, in an area that includes most of Aveyron and parts of neighboring départements. At least 75% of any grain or fodder fed must come from the area.
The milk must be whole, raw (not heated above ), and unfiltered except to remove macroscopic particles.
The addition of rennet must occur within 48 hours of milking.
The Penicillium roqueforti used in the production must be produced in France from the natural caves of Roquefort-sur-Soulzon.
The salting process must be performed using dry salt.
The whole process of maturation, cutting, packaging and refrigeration of the cheese must take place in the commune of Roquefort-sur-Soulzon.

Glutamate content
Roquefort has a high content of free glutamate, 1,280 mg per 100 g of cheese.

Health benefits
According to a 2012 study, Roquefort contains anti-inflammatory compounds. A study from 2013 found that proteins from Roquefort cheese inhibit chlamydia propagation and LPS (lipopolysaccharide) leukocyte migration.

See also

List of French cheeses
List of cheeses
Stilton

References

Sheep's-milk cheeses
Food product brands
French products with protected designation of origin
French cheeses
Occitan cheeses
Blue cheeses
Massif Central
Cheese with eyes